Kryukovo is a rural locality (a village) in Razinskoye Rural Settlement, Kharovsky District, Vologda Oblast, Russia. The population was 122 as of 2002.

Geography 
Kryukovo is located 43 km north of Kharovsk (the district's administrative centre) by road. Dorogushikha is the nearest rural locality.

References 

Rural localities in Kharovsky District